The speculum is a patch, often distinctly coloured, on the secondary wing feathers, or remiges, of some birds.

Examples of the colour(s) of the speculum in a number of ducks are:

 Common teal and green-winged teal: Iridescent green edged with buff.
 Blue-winged teal: Iridescent green. The species' common name comes from the sky-blue wing coverts.
 Crested duck and bronze-winged duck: Iridescent purple-bronze, edged white.
 Pacific black duck: Iridescent green, edged light buff.
 Mallard:  Iridescent purple-blue with white edges.
 American black duck: Iridescent violet bordered in black and may have a thin white trailing edge.
 Northern pintail: Iridescent green in male and brown in female, both are white on trailing edge.
 Gadwall: Both sexes have white inner secondaries.
 Yellow-billed duck: Iridescent green or blue, bordered white.

Bright wing speculums are also known from a number of other birds; among them are several parrots from the genus Amazona with red or orange speculums, though in this case the colors are pigmentary and non-iridescent.

References

Feathers
Ducks